Artists’ Vocal Ensemble (AVE) is a professional choral ensemble directed by  early music specialist Jonathan Dimmock. AVE has become known in the San Francisco Bay Area for presenting sacred polyphony for today’s spiritual seekers.

Founded on St Cecilia's Day 2004, AVE brings to life many of the masterworks from the Renaissance and Tudor periods. While presenting programs of scholarly interest, AVE strives to create experiences that are emotional, spiritual, and contemplative.

Current vocalists 
 Sopranos: Tonia d'Amelio, Rita Lilly, Shauna Fallihee, Carol Kessler
 Altos: Heidi Waterman, Celeste Winant, James Apgar, Clifton Massey
 Tenors: Sam W. Smith, Steven Ziegler, David Kurtenbach, Neal Rogers
 Basses: Nicholas Grishkoff, Josh Henderson, Micah Epps, Chung Wai Soong

References

External links
 Official site
 YouTube media page
 California Fusion review, San Francisco Classical Voice
 Saint Francis of Assisi review, San Francisco Classical Voice
 Monteverdi Vespers review, San Francisco Classical Voice
 Beauty Awakens review, San Francisco Classical Voice
 Josquin des Prez review, San Francisco Classical Voice
 Missa Veni Sancte Spiritus review, San Francisco Classical Voice

Musical groups established in 2004
Musical groups from San Francisco
Choirs in the San Francisco Bay Area
Early music choirs